Deerfield (also known as Deerfield Street) is an unincorporated community and census-designated place within Upper Deerfield Township, Cumberland County, New Jersey, United States. It was first listed as a CDP in the 2020 census with a population of 230.

Deerfield has a post office with ZIP code 08313; the post office uses the Deerfield Street name.

Demographics

References

Upper Deerfield Township, New Jersey
Unincorporated communities in Cumberland County, New Jersey
Unincorporated communities in New Jersey
Census-designated places in Cumberland County, New Jersey
Census-designated places in New Jersey